Kribi Lighthouse is located in Kribi, in the southern part of Cameroon near the Gulf of Guinea. It is a currently active lighthouse in a tourist destination, even though the historic structure is closed to tourists.

History 
The lighthouse was built in 1906 by the German colonialists who had occupied Kamerun (the lighthouse and a church are the legacy of German colonial construction in the town); today it is part of Francophone Cameroon. In the early days there was a keeper's cottage by the lighthouse, but that has been removed today. Today it is by the beach resort of Kribi and just north of the tourist destination Lobe Waterfall. The location of the lighthouse at Kribi matched the town's status as the centre of trade for the southern region, which was notable for rubber and ivory.

Location 

The local Hotel du Phare, is termed as the "host hotel" of the lighthouse by the travel industry, at the Kienké River. Douala is a few hours' drive away.

Specifications 
The tower is circular and painted white with a red top where the gallery is located. It is 15 metres tall by itself, but 18 metres above sea level. Its three white flashes every 12 seconds are visible up to 14 nautical miles away. From the rear there is a continuous green light visible on the range line to the steeple of the village church. The year round wind averages are 83% onshore towards 45 degrees north. Since the first half of 2006 it has been listed as historic in the World List of Lights.

See also 
 List of lighthouses in Cameroon

References

External links 

 

Lighthouses completed in 1906
Lighthouses in Cameroon
1906 establishments in the German colonial empire